Nomenclator may refer to:

Nomenclator omnium rerum propria nomina variis linguis explicata indicans, 16th century book written by Hadrianus Junius
Nomenclator, in cryptography, a kind of substitution cypher
Nomenclator (nomenclature) as a noun meaning: a book listing names or terms; someone providing names to another person; an official announcing people at a public gathering; a person who applies names.
Nomenclator of Leiden University Library, the first printed institutional library catalog

See also
 Nomenclature, a system of names or terms